Márcio Gonzaga de Azevedo (born 5 February 1986), known as Márcio Azevedo, is a Brazilian footballer who plays for ABC as a left back.

Career

Early career
Born in Guarabira, Brazil, Márcio Azevedo joined the local Juventude youth teams at a young age. Following his success in the youth ranks, he was promoted to the first team in 2004. He made his official debut on 3 December 2006, in a 5–3 loss to Corinthians. In the 2006–07 season, despite making 13 appearances (3 assists), Azevedo was not among the coach's first choices, which prompted him to consider other options. 

In September 2007, he signed with Fortaleza on a loan. He was a regular starter for the side.

Atlético Paranaense
He moved to Atlético Paranaense in June 2008, and appeared 24 times (21 in the championship and 3 in the Copa Sudamericana) and scored one goal. The following season he continued to be one of the main players on the club's team, playing 29 games (3 assists). In the 2009–10 season, Azevedo was seriously injured for the first time and lost his place in the starting 11. He managed to play in 10 games (3 assists), and at the end of the season he started looking for a new club.

Botafogo
On 1 January 2011, Azevedo transferred to one of Brazil's biggest teams, Botafogo. Although he struggled with a new injury that kept him on the bench for most of the season (12 appearances, 1 assist), the club insisted on keeping him. Following this difficulty, Azevedo gained prominence in the 2011–12 season when he played in 33 games (1 goal, 4 assists), impressing the European scouts.

Metalist Kharkiv
On 27 February 2013, after two-and-a-half years with Botafogo, Azevedo signed with Ukrainian Premier League club Metalist in Kharkiv, for a transfer fee of 3 million. The move allowed him to join five of his countrymen on Metalist:  Cleiton Xavier, Willian, Fininho, Jajá, and Marlos.
In the second half of the 2012–13 season, he played in only 8 games, but left good impressions on the Metalist staff. In the 2013–14 season, Azevedo played in 33 games (making 1 assist).

Shakhtar Donetsk
After his exceptional appearances with the team of Kharkiv, Azevedo had gained notice and the Ukrainian giants FC Shakhtar Donetsk and Mircea Lucescu offered to purchase him. On 17 August 2014, he signed a four-year contract with FC Shakhtar Donetsk for a transfer fee of 4 million. An injury suffered on 9 March 2015 kept him out for 112 days, so that he only competed in 6 games. Despite his return to the squad, his leg injury remained an issue, and in the 2015–16 season he only played 11 games (2 assists). After a very difficult period for the defender, marred by 441 days on the injury list, Azevedo returned to action in a home game against FC Chornomorets Odesa in May 2017.

PAOK (loan)
In late December 2017, the administration of the Greek Super League club PAOK was close to signing Azevedo. The 31-year-old player was expected to replace Croatian international left defender Marin Leovac, in the current squad of the Greek Cup winners, ahead of the second half of the 2017–18 season.
The club signed Azevedo until the end of the season and paid 400,000 for a long on him.

Athletico Paranaense return
On 24 July 2018, Athletico Paranaense announced that they had signed Azevedo until the end of 2019. On 17 December 2018, Azevedo signed a contract extension to stay at the club until the end of December 2020.

Career statistics

Honours
Fortaleza
 Campeonato Cearense: 2008

Athletico Paranaense
 Campeonato Paranaense: 2009, 2020
 Copa Sudamericana: 2018, 2021
 J.League Cup / Copa Sudamericana Championship: 2019
 Copa do Brasil: 2019

Shakhtar Donetsk
 Ukrainian Premier League: 2016–17
 Ukrainian Cup: 2016, 2017
 Ukrainian Super Cup: 2016, 2017

PAOK
Greek Cup: 2017–18

References

External links

Márcio Azevedo profile at FutPédia 
 

1986 births
Living people
Sportspeople from Paraíba
Association football fullbacks
Brazilian footballers
Brazilian expatriate footballers
Esporte Clube Juventude players
Fortaleza Esporte Clube players
Club Athletico Paranaense players
Botafogo de Futebol e Regatas players
FC Metalist Kharkiv players
FC Shakhtar Donetsk players
PAOK FC players
Campeonato Brasileiro Série A players
Ukrainian Premier League players
Expatriate footballers in Ukraine
Brazilian expatriate sportspeople in Ukraine
Expatriate footballers in Greece
Brazilian expatriate sportspeople in Greece